FC Vaslui II was a Romanian professional football club from Vaslui, Romania, founded in 2007. It was the reserve team of FC Vaslui. The team was dissolved in 2014 due to lack of funds.

Honours
Liga IV – Vaslui County
Winners (2): 2007–08, 2008–09

FC Vaslui
Vaslui
Defunct football clubs in Romania
Football clubs in Vaslui County
Association football clubs established in 2007
Association football clubs disestablished in 2014
2007 establishments in Romania
2014 disestablishments in Romania